Oxybelus is a genus of wasps in the family Crabronidae. The species are found worldwide except in the Australasian realm. 
They are especially represented in the Palearctic. Oxybelus is the largest genus in Crabronidae, with 264 species known. Oxybelus wasps sometimes gravitate towards people, flying around travellers and landing on them, even when they are shooed away. It is not known why they do it, however it might possibly be them trying to drink sweat for its minerals.

Species (Europe) 
Source  
Oxybelus argentatus Curtis 1833
Oxybelus aurantiacus Mocsary 1883
Oxybelus bipunctatus Olivier 1812
Oxybelus cocacolae P. Verhoeff 1968
Oxybelus diphyllus (A. Costa 1882)
Oxybelus dissectus Dahlbom 1845
Oxybelus dusmeti Mingo Perez 1966
Oxybelus fischeri Spinola 1839
Oxybelus haemorrhoidalis Olivier 1812
Oxybelus hastatus Fabricius 1804
Oxybelus lamellatus Olivier 1811
Oxybelus latidens Gerstaecker 1867
Oxybelus latro Olivier 1812
Oxybelus lineatus (Fabricius 1787)
Oxybelus maculipes F. Smith 1856
Oxybelus mandibularis Dahlbom 1845
Oxybelus mucronatus (Fabricius 1793)
Oxybelus occitanicus Marquet 1896
Oxybelus polyacanthus A. Costa 1882
Oxybelus quatuordecimnotatus Jurine 1807
Oxybelus spectabilis Gerstaecker 1867
Oxybelus subspinosus Klug 1835
Oxybelus trispinosus (Fabricius 1787)
Oxybelus uniglumis (Linnaeus 1758)
Oxybelus variegatus Wesmael 1852

See also
 List of Oxybelus species

References

External links
Oxybelus images at  Consortium for the Barcode of Life
 Catalog of Sphecidae California Academy of Sciences Institute of Biodiversity

Articles containing video clips
Crabronidae
Hymenoptera of Europe